Hibbertia hirticalyx is a species of flowering plant in the family Dilleniaceae and is endemic to south-eastern Australia. It is an erect, spreading or low-lying shrub with hairy foliage, elliptic leaves, and yellow flowers with eight to twelve stamens arranged in a cluster on one side of the two carpels.

Description 
The edges of the leaves are turned down or rolled under. There are eight to twelve stamens arranged in a single cluster on one side of the two carpels, each carpel with four ovules.

Taxonomy 
Hibbertia hirticalyx was first formally described in 1998 by Hellmut R. Toelken in the Journal of the Adelaide Botanic Gardens from specimens collected near Gladstone in Tasmania, in 1983. The specific epithet (hirticalyx) means "sepals with long, soft hairs".

Distribution and habitat 
This hibbertia grows in open forest in dry areas on Wilson's Promontory in Victoria, in the north of Tasmania and on the Bass Strait Islands.

See also 
 List of Hibbertia species

References 

hirticalyx
Flora of Victoria (Australia)
Flora of Tasmania
Plants described in 2010
Taxa named by Hellmut R. Toelken